The International Airlines Travel Agent Network (IATAN) is a Miami-based trade association in the United States representing the interests of its member companies (airlines) and the U.S. travel distribution network (travel agencies). It is an independent department of the International Air Transport Association (IATA).

In addition, it (along with the IATA) is the body responsible for the standard international codes for airlines, airports, hotels, cities and car rental firms. These codes provide a method to link international travel network with international suppliers.

See also 
 American Society of Travel Agents
 IATA airport code

References

International trade associations
Traveling business organizations